Bandit Peak is a  double-summit granitic mountain located in the Glacier Peak Wilderness of the North Cascades, in Chelan County of Washington state. The mountain is situated east of the crest of the Cascade Range, on land managed by the Okanogan–Wenatchee National Forest. Its nearest higher neighbor is Brahma Peak,  to the north. Bandit Peak is the ninth-highest peak on Chiwawa Ridge, and other notable peaks on this ridge include Mount Berge, Buck Mountain, Cirque Mountain, Napeequa Peak, Helmet Butte, and Chiwawa Mountain. Precipitation runoff from Bandit Peak drains west into Napeequa River; or east into the Chiwawa River.

Geology

The North Cascades features some of the most rugged topography in the Cascade Range with craggy peaks, ridges, and deep glacial valleys. Geological events occurring many years ago created the diverse topography and drastic elevation changes over the Cascade Range leading to various climate differences.

The history of the formation of the Cascade Mountains dates back millions of years ago to the late Eocene Epoch. With the North American Plate overriding the Pacific Plate, episodes of volcanic igneous activity persisted. In addition, small fragments of the oceanic and continental lithosphere called terranes created the North Cascades about 50 million years ago. During the Pleistocene period dating back over two million years ago, glaciation advancing and retreating repeatedly scoured and shaped the landscape. Uplift and faulting in combination with glaciation have been the dominant processes which have created the tall peaks and deep valleys of the North Cascades area.

Extensive volcanic activity began to take place in the oligocene, about 35 million years ago. Due to Glacier Peak's proximity to Bandit, volcanic ash is common in the area.

Climate
Most weather fronts originate in the Pacific Ocean, and travel northeast toward the Cascade Mountains. As fronts approach the North Cascades, they are forced upward by the peaks of the Cascade Range, causing them to drop their moisture in the form of rain or snowfall onto the Cascades (Orographic lift). As a result, the west side of the North Cascades experiences high precipitation, especially during the winter months in the form of snowfall. During winter months, weather is usually cloudy, but, due to high pressure systems over the Pacific Ocean that intensify during summer months, there is often little or no cloud cover during the summer. Because of maritime influence, snow tends to be wet and heavy, resulting in high avalanche danger.

See also

 Geology of the Pacific Northwest
 Geography of the North Cascades

References

External links
 Bandit Peak photo: Flickr
 Bandit Peak: Flickr photo
 Weather forecast: National Weather Service
 Black Hole Couloir: YouTube
 Bandit Peak: Flickr

Cascade Range
Mountains of Washington (state)
Mountains of Chelan County, Washington
North Cascades
North American 2000 m summits